Raya Sirena is a 2022 Philippine television drama romantic fantasy series broadcast by GMA Network. Directed by Cristano Aquino, it stars Sofia Pablo in the title role. It premiered on April 24, 2022 on the network's Sunday Grande sa Hapon line up. The series concluded on June 5, 2022 with a total of 7 episodes.

Cast and characters
Lead cast
 Sofia Pablo as Raya

Supporting cast
 Allen Ansay as Gavin
 Savior Ramos as Ape
 Shirley Fuentes as Helga
 Mosang as Matet
 Gerald Pesigan as Buknoy
 Shecko Apostol as Poknat
 Jana Francine Taladro as Thea
 Ayeesha Cervantes as Chriselle
 Reins Mike as Lua
 Juan Carlos Galano as Bulan
 Elias Point as Otep
 Roberta Daleon as Martina
 Ralph Ernest Francia as Roman

Guest cast
 Bernadette Allyson as Elena

Ratings
According to AGB Nielsen Philippines' Nationwide Urban Television Audience Measurement People in television homes, the pilot episode of Raya Sirena earned a 3.5% rating.

References

External links
 
 

2022 Philippine television series debuts
2022 Philippine television series endings
Filipino-language television shows
GMA Network drama series
Mermaids in television
Philippine fantasy television series
Philippine romance television series
Television shows set in the Philippines